Great Salkeld is a small village and civil parish in the Eden District of Cumbria, England, a few miles to the north east of Penrith and bordering the River Eden. At the 2001 census the parish had a population of 445, decreasing to 412 at the 2011 Census.

The village is believed to have been connected at one time by a bridge over the River Eden to Little Salkeld. In the Middle Ages, the village was sometimes referred to in documents as Salkeld Regis as it was at times the property of the Crown.

Description

It is a linear village with a fine ensemble of vernacular buildings built in the attractive local red sandstone. The village's amenities are few, but include a village hall, a pub "The Highland Drove", which has won many awards for its food, and an Anglican church.
Occupying an imposing central position in the village, St Cuthbert's Church is a fortified church that was built in the 12th century, and is remarkable for the strong defensive pele tower which was added to it circa 1380. The tower room is tunnel-vaulted and the upper floor has a fireplace to make it habitable, and a doorway into the nave. A formidable yett, a door with interlaced iron bars, guards access to the tower. The Norman doorway to the church has similar features to that at St Bees Priory on the Cumbrian coast, with head masks incorporated into the zig-zag pattern. The chancel and arch were restored in 1866. There are six bells hung for full-circle ringing.

Great Salkeld Rectory, of medieval origins but modified in 1674 by Thomas Musgrave, also incorporates a pele tower, probably of the early 15th century.

The primary school, which could trace its origins back to 1515, closed in 2004 despite a rigorous campaign to save it.

The largest house in the parish is Nunwick Hall, built in 1892 to a design in the Tudor style by Charles John Ferguson. The local cricket team is named after it. This building should not be confused with the eighteenth-century Nunwick Hall in Northumberland.

Surrounding hamlets

The parish of Great Salkeld includes the hamlets of Salkeld Dykes, which is divided into North and South Dykes, Halfwaywell, Inglewood Bank and Burrell Green.

See also

Listed buildings in Great Salkeld

References

External links
 Cumbria County History Trust: Great Salkeld (nb: provisional research only – see Talk page)

 
Villages in Cumbria
Civil parishes in Cumbria
Eden District